Vincenzo Galdi (11 October 1871 – 23 December 1961) was an Italian model and photographer. Galdi is regarded as a pioneer in Italian erotic photography. He is known to be first in breaking the taboo of not depicting an erect penis.

Biography

Early years 

Galdi was born in Naples on October 11, 1871. His father Vincenzo was one of the descendants of an ancient Italian noble house with title of baron, one of whose ancestors was a Norman knight, who participated in liberation of Salerno from the Saracens. He belonged to a branch, which in the middle of the eighteenth century had settled in Marigliano and inherited the title of Castelan of Ischia and Procida, as well as Lord of Corleone in Sicily. Elder Vincenzo was a banker and owner of a hat factory. Vincenzo Galdi's mother, Rosa D'Amore, was the sister of the mayor of Marigliano.

Naples 

Vincenzo Galdi enrolled in the Institute of Fine Arts in Naples. During his studies he was especially impressed with optics and photographic technique, even building a wooden camera with a telescopic lens by himself. As a student he worked at the studio of Giorgio Sommer at his photographic studio on Via Monte di Dio.
He started to study with German photographer Guglielmo Plüschow, who had a studio in Naples in 1886 or 1887. As he was strikingly good-looking, Galdi also modeled for Plüschow at that time. Starting from 1887, and until 1890, the young Galdi also worked in theater as a set designer, instrumentalist and actor with the Eduardo Scarpetta's company and then with Alberto Cozzella and Vincenzo Esposito. But the economic default of the former Kingdom of the Two Sicilies and the decline of Naples art scene led Galdi to leave his homeland and move to Rome with Guglielmo Plüschow.

Rome 
When he arrived in Rome in 1890, Galdi bought a penthouse with terrace on Via Sardegna 55 in the new Ludovisi district, still suburban at that time, where he was going to live with her older sister Eutilia. He opened a studio on Via Campania 45 – not far from his apartment – specializing in feminine and masculine nude art, becoming soon the most well-known author of the time in that genre after von Gloeden and Plüschow. He also produced portraits and some of his photographs were sold as postcards. The Via Campania studio also worked as an experimental an art gallery.
 
When Plüschow decided to move to Rome around 1895 himself, he took residence in the same street as Galdi (at number 34). The two continued their collaboration, started in Naples. This fact is documented by a letter by Theodore F. Dwight, director of the Boston Public Library, sent in January 1896 in which he described his visit to the studio of the photographer: "Plüschow was not present in person, but his assistant was and I was given every pleasure to see his collection, apparently without you expecting me to buy it. While we were talking, the beautiful Italian, with black hair and mustache, a rather vigorous build and wide shoulders, over the age of 24, who seemed anxious to be to noted and acted as a master of the place? I asked and learned that it was Vincenzo Galdi, the model of many of our photos. He laid for those in which he sat on the wall, with a band around his head, and along with Edoardo, the most beautiful, 17 in an infinite number of other photos. I told him that I know him from the tip of his feet to the top of his head and he immediately became very talkative, showing me all his preferred poses. We have established such friendly relationships as I have now the privilege of taking pictures in the studio of Plüschow and of the Plüschow models."
 
The partnership with Plüschow lasted probably until 1902, given that the following year he moved his own study to Corso Umberto 333, where he worked with two assistants: Pietro Magnotti and Enrico Simoncini. Among the photographs attributed to Galdi are a series of shots commissioned by English painter Robert Hawthorn Kitson, depicting Carlo, his young lover from Taormina, whom he adopted. The photographs bear the stamp of Galdi with the address of via Sardegna 55 and are dated 1906.
 
In 1902, Galdi married Virginia Guglielmi (12 April 1885 – 24 May 1941), an elementary school teacher. They had three children together: Ernesto Theodor (b. 1903), Vincenzo (b. 1904), named Vincenzino, and Michelangelo (b. 1917).

Plüschow scandal 
In 1902 Plüschow was charged with "solicitation to prostitution" and "seduction of minors" and had to spend eight months in jail. Another scandal followed in 1907, and, in 1910, Plüschow left Italy for good and returned to Berlin. There are no extant documents that show the trial involved Galdi as well, but a letter of Edward Irenaeus Prime-Stevenson, that mentions G. – famous Rome nude photographer being arrested and sentenced for "outraging public morals" due to overly audacious photographs for sale everywhere, even in Rome.

The scandal of the Naiads fountain 

When the sculptor Mario Rutelli received a commission to renew the 'Naiads fountain' on Piazza della Repubblica he collaborated with Galdi. They met at one of masonic lodges, to which Galdi and Rutelli belonged. Galdi had just returned from Paris, where he visited exhibition of Rodin, and was describing the great art of French sculptor, when Rutelli blurted out: "Vincenzo, I want new models, I'll show you what Rodin has conceived  in a dark museum. I'm Sicilian and I will put my own statues in a bath of light so that they will look alive." Galdi procured the models and photographed them, finding shots suitable for his ideas and those of the Mario Rutelli. The sculptor created casts from these nude photographs of pagan nymphs, which immediately created outrage in conservative circles. The question was raised at the session of the City Council, during which some clerics and conservative opponents, offended by the proud nudity of the naiads, asked the Mayor for immediate removal of the statues from the fountain. Instead, the city council decided to simply cover the fountain with a fence in order to prevent the public from seeing the statues. One councilor asked to start an investigation against Galdi and Rutelli. Photographs and drawings were seized. All ended up in the press with Avanti defending the sculptures and L'Osservatore Romano judging them as "a gross", criticizing them sharply from an artistic and moral point of view. The situation was resolved spontaneously one night when a group of students destroyed the fence, thereby opening the monument to the public.

Art trade 
Around the time when Guglielmo Plüschow left Rome, Vincenzo Galdi abandoned photography and concentrated on art trade. He opened an art gallery in Rome, in Via del Babuino, the "Galleria Galdi". He started the art trade with organizing exhibition and selling futurist works of Giacomo Balla and Umberto Boccioni with help of Anton Giulio Bragaglia and his brothers. Some traditionalist painters protested the exhibition and broke the window of Galdi's gallery, even damaging some works. Originally the gallery was located at the same building as the Galdi's studio and then moved to via Sistina,75, where it stayed until early 1920s. It changed several location until it was moved to via Baburino 180. The gallery remained there until the end of 1950s, when Galdi closed it due to his old age and failing health. Vincenzo Galdi was known to bring regional Italian and international artist to Rome. Galdi's grandson remembers that he was the one who brought to fame contemporary Roman painters Onorato Carlandi and Pio Joris. He was a good friend with american art historian Bernard Berenson. Berenson learned the technic of macrophotography from Galdi as a tool to study art works. Vincenzo Galdi's son, Ernesto, who was suffering from poliomyelitis, lived for a few years with Berenson on his villa in Settignano near Florence, because at that time Florence was the only place in Italy, where the treatment for the illness was available. Despite Galdi's liberal views, he was called to be the part of panel of experts for the protection against art counterfeit by National Fascist Federation of Art Dealers.

Death 
Vincenzo Galdi died in Rome on December 20, 1961, in Zappalà clinic, where he had been hospitalized with prostate cancer. He was buried on the 23rd of the same month on the cemetery of Verano, near his wife Virginia, who had died in 1941.

Gallery

Photographs of Vincenzo Galdi by Guglielmo Plüschow

Modern days 
Gallery "Au Bonheur du Jour" in Paris held solo exhibitions of Galdi works, called "Galdi secret" in 2011. Some of Galdi photography works were recently discovered archives of the Galerie Texbraun and exhibited in Galerie David Guiraud in Paris in 2017 alongside works of Wilhelm von Gloeden and Guglielmo Plüschow. Galdi's works were also exhibited in Munich Stadtmuseum in 2009 as part of exhibition "Nude Visions – 150 Jahre Körperbilder in der Fotografie"

Bibliography 
 Albers, Bernhard (editor), Galdi / Gloeden / Plüschow. Aktaufnahmen aus der Sammlung Uwe Scheid, Rimbaud Presse, Aachen 1993.
 Et in Arcadia ego. Fotografien von Wilhelm von Gloeden, Guglielmo Plüschow und Vincenzo Galdi, Edition Oehrli, Zurich 2000.
 Janssen, Volker (editor), Wilhelm von Gloeden, Wilhelm von Plüschow, Vincenzo Galdi. Italienische Jünglings-Photographien um 1900, Janssen Verlag, Berlin 1991.
 Poésies Arcadiennes. Von Gloeden. Vincenzo Galdi. Von Plüschow. Photographies fin XIXe, Galerie au bonheur du jour, Paris 2003.
 Puig, Herman (editor), Von Gloeden et le XIXe siècle, Puig, Paris 1977.
 Puig, Herman (editor), Les jardins interdits – Puig, Paris, s.d. ma ca. 1985.
 Canet, Nicole (editor), Galdi, von Gloeden, von Plüschow – Beautés Siciliennes – Nicole Canet, Paris, 2014.
 Giovanni Dall'Orto, Vincenzo Galdi, "Wikipink", July 2014 (Detailed biography, in Italian).

See also

References 

 

 

 

1871 births
1961 deaths
Italian artists' models
Italian male models
Photographers from Naples
Nude photography
19th-century Neapolitan people
Italian LGBT people
LGBT history in Italy